West Kowloon station (abbreviated WEK), also known as Hong Kong West Kowloon, is the southern terminus of and the only station on the Hong Kong section of the Guangzhou–Shenzhen–Hong Kong Express Rail Link (XRL). The station connects to China's high-speed rail (HSR) network across the border through dedicated tunnels and includes a Mainland Port Area where the laws of (Mainland) China are enforced. It was constructed by the MTR Corporation Limited as the project manager commissioned by the Hong Kong Government, through subcontractors.

The station terminal is located in Jordan West Kowloon, north of the West Kowloon Cultural District between the Airport Express and Tung Chung line's Kowloon station and the Tuen Ma line's Austin station. The footprint of the new station extends into the underground level of the West Kowloon Cultural District.

The station closed between 2020 and 2023 due to the COVID-19 pandemic. Limited services resumed in January 2023, with full services expected to resume in April 2023.

Services

Train services
Before the pandemic, the West Kowloon station was served by both short-distance and long-haul train services. Short-distance services consisted of a frequent service to mainland Chinese cities in neighbouring Guangdong province, including Shenzhen, Dongguan, and Guangzhou, while long-distance services linked Hong Kong to at least 16 major destinations in mainland China. Upon the initial resumption of service in January 2023, the station will be served only by short-haul services to Guangzhou, Dongguan and Shenzhen. Short-haul trains are operated by both the MTRC (the Vibrant Express) and China Railway, whereas the long-haul trains were only operated by China Railway.

Both the MTRC and China Railway sell tickets for the other's trains. Ticket prices are set in Renminbi (RMB) which are used by China Railway's ticketing services. The MTRC use only Hong Kong Dollars (HKD) which fares are set monthly based on China Railway's RMB prices and current conversion rates with the RMB. Seat selection and remaining seat information are not available on MTRC's online ticketing platform.

Although the Express Rail Link has a design capacity of 20 trains per hour in each direction, the capacity is not expected to be fully utilised for some years.

Short-haul services
 14 trains per day to Futian
 9 trains per day to Shenzhen North
 8 trains per day to Guangzhou South via Shenzhen North and Humen
 6 trains per day to Guangzhou East via Shenzhen North, Dongguan South and Dongguan

Pre-pandemic services 

Short-haul services
 2 trains per hour to Futian
 4 trains per hour to Shenzhen North
 1 train per hour to Humen
 2 trains per hour to Guangzhou South

Long-haul services
 8 trains per day to Chaoshan
 1 train per day to Shantou
 1 train per day to Xiamen North
 3 trains per day to Xiamen
 1 train per day to Fuzhou
 1 train per day to Zhaoqing East
 1 train per day to Nanning East
 2 trains per day to Guilin West
 1 train per day to Guiyang North
 1 train per day to Guiyang East
 1 train per day to Kunming South
 1 train per day to Chongqing West
 1 train per day to Tianjin West
 1 train per day to Beijing West

Ground transport
Related developments by the Hong Kong Government in West Kowloon, expect to improve the efficiency of road and pedestrian access routes, as well as to resolve a problematic traffic intersection in West Kowloon. These road developments hope to meet the transport needs of the entire area of the new development area of West Kowloon Cultural District and West Kowloon station after completion.

Transportation Study identified the following specific road improvement measures:
 Build a connection from Austin Road West (near Canton Road) to Lin Cheung Road (Jordan Road north) via an underground carriageway, so that pedestrians will have unimpeded access and egress between West Kowloon Cultural District, West Kowloon station and Kowloon station
 Conduct Austin Road and Canton Road junction improvement works, including considering the widening of the Canton Road carriageway and expansion of the existing underground pedestrian tunnel system
 Other road improvement projects in West Kowloon will be directly connected to a newly developed area near the West Kowloon Highway, in order to reduce the load on the region's transport network

Structure

Construction of the West Kowloon station project was divided into two parts, XRL810A (northern part) and XRL810B (southern part) (XRL meaning eXpress Rail Link). The northern construction area was awarded to Leighton Contractors & Gammon Construction responsible for joint operations. The southern part of the project was awarded to a consortium of Laing O'Rourke, HCCG (Hsin Chong) & Paul Y jointly responsible for the construction.

As a cross-border station, the West Kowloon station has customs and immigration facilities for passengers to go through prior to boarding, removing the need for trains to stop at the Hong Kong-Mainland China border, reducing travel time.

Platforms

The station serves both 16-car long-haul trains and shorter 8-car short-haul regional trains.  In its current initial stages, the station uses only 10 tracks (6 long-haul and 4 short-haul) with 14 platforms (6 long-haul and 4 short-haul) consisting of 5 island platforms and 4 side platforms. However, the station was designed with 15 tracks (9 long-haul and 6 short-haul) with 21 platforms (9 long-haul and 12 short-haul) using 9 island platforms and 3 side platforms for full operations.

The long-haul trains use longer platforms located on the eastern end of the station. This part of the station has 9 tracks with 4 island platforms and 1 side platform. However, as of 2022, it has only ever used 6 tracks with 2 side platforms and 2 island platforms (Platforms 4–9). Passengers here board and alight from the same platform. Each platform here has 4 lifts and 4 escalators (2 for arrivals and 2 for departures). This means an island platform has a total of 8 escalators and 8 lifts. The arrivals escalators and lifts connect to the Arrival concourse on B2 and the departures connecting from the Departure concourse on B3.

Short-haul trains (including MTRC's Vibrant Express) use shorter platforms which employ the Spanish solution arrangement, where platforms for boarding and alighting are separately located on opposing sides of the track. This reduces dwell times of trains in the station by reducing boarding and alighting times of passengers to allow for a higher frequency of service. Currently, there are only 4 tracks in use for the short-haul trains, with 3 island platforms (2 of which are used for alighting) and 2 side platforms with a total of 8 platforms (Platforms 11–18). The boarding platforms (both island and side) each use 3 lifts and 2 lifts. The alighting platforms each use 2 lifts and 3 escalators. In the future, there will be a total of 6 tracks (5 island platforms and 2 side platforms) serving short-haul trains.

Exits

A:  Austin station 

B: Wui Man Road Pick-up/Drop-off 

C: Lin Cheung Road (closed) 

D: Green Plaza 

F: Green Plaza 

G: Xiqu Centre 

H: Green Plaza 

J: Coach Pick-up/Drop-off 

K1:  Austin station 

K2: West Kowloon Station Bus Terminus 

K4: Sky Corridor 

M: Elements 

N:  Austin station

Landscaping
West Kowloon station features an extensive green garden across the roof area of the station. It also sets up a large collection of cultural elements and entertainment spaces. Passengers can easily cross the ground floor between Kowloon station, Austin station and West Kowloon Cultural District, providing Hong Kong residents and visitors ample public open space and a comfortable green walking environment. Above the station, an area of approximately  has been planted with a large number of plants and trees with traffic separated. All to create a pedestrian area, a green platform, and a wooded park that will integrate with the West Kowloon Cultural District harbourside parklands.

In addition, the West Kowloon station entrance lobby area features a green ecological leisure channel zone to tie in with the greenery on top of the building.

History and development

The original    While construction of the station was still planned for completion in 2015, major flooding occurred in the railway tunnels under construction on 30 March 2014. This resulted in great damage to the tunnel boring machines. Internal MTR reports suggested causes were incomplete tender drawings, site surveys, and planning before construction began. The station was formally opened on 4 September 2018 and high-speed trains started to run to destinations in Mainland China from 23 September 2018.

RTHK reported that the final cost of the construction was 30% more than the initial estimate.

Due to the COVID-19 pandemic, then chief executive of the territory Carrie Lam announced that West Kowloon station will be closed from midnight of  until further notice. The station has since then remained closed to the public, although it was used on 30 June and 1 July 2022 to facilitate Chinese leader Xi Jinping and first lady Peng Liyuan's visit to Hong Kong for ceremonies related to 25th anniversary of the Hong Kong handover and inauguration of John Lee as the new Chief Executive.

The station reopened on 3 January 2023.

Mainland Port Area

The Mainland Port Area is an area inside West Kowloon station that serves as a border control point between mainland China and Hong Kong. The area has been effectively ceded to Mainland China for a token HK$1,000 a year in rent. Since September 2018, Mainland Chinese immigration and police personnel operate exclusively within the area, and the laws of mainland China, rather than Hong Kong, are enforced.

This arrangement was controversial both before and after its implementation. Pro-democracy advocates were concerned about the erosion of Hong Kong's freedoms and autonomy under the "One Country, Two Systems" framework, and the Hong Kong Bar Association stated that the arrangement caused "the integrity of the Basic Law" to be "irreparably breached" and would "severely undermine" confidence in the rule of law in Hong Kong. Notably, the International Covenant on Civil and Political Rights, which applies in Hong Kong, does not apply in the Mainland Port Area, leading to human rights concerns.

Area definition
The area delineated and coloured orange on Plan No. 1 and Annex 1 to Plan No. 1 in Schedule 2 of the Guangzhou-Shenzhen-Hong Kong Express Rail Link (Co-location) Ordinance is declared as the Mainland Port Area. It comprises the designated areas on B2 and B3 levels, the platform areas on B4 level as well as the connecting passageways. A train compartment of a passenger train in operation on the Hong Kong Section of the Express Rail Link is to be regarded as part of the Mainland Port Area. This arrangement will facilitate mainland border control preclearance in Hong Kong.

Except for reserved matters, the Mainland Port Area is to be regarded as an area lying outside Hong Kong but lying within Mainland China for the purposes of the application of the laws of Mainland China, and of the laws of Hong Kong, in the Mainland Port Area; and the delineation of jurisdiction over the Mainland Port Area. It does not affect the boundary of the administrative division of the Hong Kong Special Administrative Region.

Although the West Kowloon HSR station is listed on a page titled  by the Shenzhen municipal government online, it is unclear whether this qualifies as a Port of Exit for the Shenzhen SEZ Visa on Arrival.

Implementation process
The joint meeting on 8 August 2017 of the Panel on Transport, the Panel on Security and the Panel on Administration of Justice and Legal Services of the Legislative Council passed the motion supporting the implementation of the "co-location arrangement" at the West Kowloon station.

The meeting on 15 November 2017 of the Legislative Council passed the motion on taking forward the follow-up tasks of the co-location arrangement at the West Kowloon station.

The Government of the Hong Kong Special Administrative Region signed the Co-operation Arrangement between the Mainland and the Hong Kong Special Administrative Region on the Establishment of the Port at the West Kowloon Station of the Guangzhou-Shenzhen-Hong Kong Express Rail Link for Implementing Co-location Arrangement with the People's Government of Guangdong Province on 18 November 2017.

On 27 December 2017, the Standing Committee of the National People's Congress approved the Co-operation Arrangement and stated that it is consistent with the Constitution of the People's Republic of China and the Basic Law of the Hong Kong Special Administrative Region.

The Guangzhou–Shenzhen–Hong Kong Express Rail Link (Co-location) Bill was passed by the Legislative Council at the meeting on 14 June 2018. The Ordinance gazetted on 22 June 2018 and come into operation on a day to be appointed by the Secretary for Transport and Housing by notice published in the Hong Kong Government Gazette.

After a ceremony to "mark the commissioning of the Mainland Port Area" was held jointly by Frank Chan, Secretary for Transport and Housing, and "a leading Communist party official from Guangdong province", democracy activists noted that it constituted an erosion of the SAR's autonomy, with Tanya Chan reported as telling local radio that "the unlawful and unconstitutional joint checkpoint has been implemented forcefully — it has caused an irreparable damage to our legal system and rule of law." Chief Executive Carrie Lam, however, denied that there was any attempt to cover up the event, despite the ceremony being closed to press and being held without advance notice to news media or to members of the Legislative Council.

In the Court of First Instance of the High Court, Judge Anderson Chow refused the applications for leave to apply for judicial review by his decision dated 27 September 2017 and 18 April 2018. He refused the applications for interim relief by his decision dated 14 August 2018. He granted the applications for leave to apply for judicial review but dismissed the substantive applications for judicial review by his judgment dated 13 December 2018.

Mainland police operations 
Since the Mainland Port Area began operations, there have been several reported cases of travellers being detained or arrested by mainland officials in Hong Kong. In one case, Simon Cheng, a Hong Kong resident working for the British consulate was detained upon returning to Hong Kong and sent back to mainland China by mainland police officers. Amid the 2019–20 Hong Kong protests, Chinese border officers have also begun to routinely search the phones of travellers for evidence of involvement in the protests.

Awards
In 2010, the West Kowloon station design won "Cityscape Awards for Architecture" in the Emerging Markets of Tourism, Travel & Transport Future Awards. In the same year on 4 November, the West Kowloon station design won the "Best Future Project ─ Infrastructure" World Architecture Festival Awards.

See also

 Woodlands Train Checkpoint
 Juxtaposed controls - co-location of immigration and customs on trains and ferries

References

Further reading
Cooperation arrangements between the Mainland and the Hong Kong Special Administrative Region on the establishment of a port at the West Kowloon Station of the Guangzhou-Shenzhen-Hong Kong Express Rail Link to implement "Co-location Arrangement"
Note on the "(Draft) Decision on the Approval of the Cooperation Arrangement between the Mainland and the Hong Kong Special Administrative Region on the Establishment of Ports at the West Kowloon Station of the Guangzhou-Shenzhen-Hong Kong Express Rail Link"
Report on the outcome of the review by the Law Committee of the National People's Congress, regarding the "(Draft) Decision on the Approval of the Cooperation Arrangement between the Mainland and the Hong Kong Special Administrative Region on the Establishment of Ports at the West Kowloon Station of the Guangzhou-Shenzhen-Hong Kong Express Rail Link"
Decision of the Standing Committee of the National People's Congress on Approving the Cooperation Arrangement between the Mainland and the Hong Kong Special Administrative Region on the establishment of a port at the West Kowloon Station of Guangzhou-Shenzhen-Hong Kong Express Rail Link to implement "Co-location Arrangement"

Kwun Chung
West Kowloon
China–Hong Kong border crossings
Juxtaposed border controls
Guangzhou–Shenzhen–Hong Kong Express Rail Link
Railway stations in Hong Kong opened in 2018
25 kV AC railway electrification
MTR